Katarzyna Zdziebło (born 28 November 1996) is a Polish racewalker. She won silver medals in the women's 20 kilometres walk and 35 kilometres walk at the 2022 World Athletics Championships. Zdziebło earned also a silver in the 20 km walk at the 2022 European Championships.

She is the Polish record holder for both the 20 km walk and 35 km walk, and multiple Polish national champion in racewalking.

Career
In 2018, she competed in the women's 20 kilometres walk event at the European Athletics Championships held in Berlin, Germany. She finished in 21st place.

In 2019, she competed in the women's 20 kilometres walk event at the Summer Universiade held in Naples, Italy, finishing in eighth place. Zdziebło also competed in the women's 20 km walk event at the 2019 World Athletics Championships held in Doha, Qatar. She finished in 21st place.

She competed in the women's 20 kilometres walk at the 2020 Summer Olympics in Tokyo, Japan, coming home in 10th place.

Achievements

International competitions

Personal bests
 10,000 metres race walk – 45:10.15 (Warsaw] 2022)
 10 kilometres race walk – 46:04 (Zaniemyśl] 2015) 
 20 kilometres race walk – 1:27:31 (Eugene, OR] 2022) 
 35 kilometres race walk – 2:40:03 (Eugene, OR] 2022)

References

External links
 

Living people
1996 births
People from Mielec
Polish female racewalkers
World Athletics Championships athletes for Poland
Competitors at the 2019 Summer Universiade
Athletes (track and field) at the 2020 Summer Olympics
Olympic female racewalkers
Olympic athletes of Poland
World Athletics Championships medalists
European Athletics Championships medalists
20th-century Polish women
21st-century Polish women